Jani Petteri Toivola (born 27 November 1977 in Vaasa, Finland) is a Finnish actor, dancer, author and an ex-politician. He studied in HB Acting Studio, New York City in 1999–2002. He has performed in several dance works, television series and plays. Toivola is also openly gay. His father is Kenyan and mother Finnish.

Toivola has been a veejay for the chart programme of the music channel The Voice. He has also so far hosted the third and fourth season of the Finnish Idols television series together with Ellen Jokikunnas.

In the Finnish parliamentary election of 2011, Toivola was elected to the Parliament of Finland as a candidate of the Green League. He was the first Finnish Black MP. In 2018 he announced that he won't be running for a third term.

Filmography
 Kuilu mielessä, (2003)
 Käenpesä, TV series (2005), as Samir Kibaki
 Meno-paluu, a travel programme (2005), host
 Ähläm Sähläm, TV series (2006), as Heikki
 Osasto 5, TV series (2006), as Ahmed Mattila
 Idols, third season of TV series (2007), host
 Kaikki kunnossa, waiter in TV series (2007)
 Big Brother Extra, fifth season of TV series (2009), host

Theatre
 Sorsastaja, Finnish National Theatre (2006)
 Hairspray, Helsinki City Theatre (2005)
 Hair, Peacock Theatre in Linnanmäki

Biography 

 Musta tulee isona valkoinen: Miten päästää irti pelosta ja häpeästä ja seistä omilla jaloillaan. Helsinki: Siltala, 2016. 
 Kirja tytölleni. Helsinki: WSOY, 2018. 
 Poika ja hame. Kuvittanut Saara Obele. Helsinki: Otava, 2021 
 Rakkaudesta. Helsinki: Kosmos, 2021.

External links

References

1977 births
Living people
People from Vaasa
Finnish people of Kenyan descent
Green League politicians
Members of the Parliament of Finland (2011–15)
Members of the Parliament of Finland (2015–19)
Finnish male television actors
Finnish gay actors
Big Brother (Finnish TV series)
Finnish LGBT politicians
LGBT legislators
Finnish male stage actors